Danielle Elizabeth Surprenant (nee Hibbard; born June 28, 1985) is an American college athletics administrator who served as director of athletics for Western Illinois University from 2018 to 2022. She previously served as an associate athletic director at Western Illinois from 2017 to 2018, and at Quincy University from 2010 to 2017. Surprenant attended John Wood Community College for two years, before transferring to Saint Francis University, where she played for the Saint Francis Red Flash women's basketball team. Surprenant was named interim  athletic director at Western Illinois University on May 17, 2018 before being named permanent athletic director at Western Illinois on April 17, 2019. Surprenant resigned as athletic director at Western Illinois on March 11, 2022.

References

External links
 
 Western Illinois profile
 Quincy profile

1985 births
Living people
People from Carthage, Illinois
Saint Francis University alumni
Western Illinois Leathernecks athletic directors
Women college athletic directors in the United States
John Wood Community College people